Nolte State Park is a  Washington state park located  northeast of Enumclaw and just south of Cumberland at the western edge of the Cascade Mountains, with  of shoreline on Deep Lake near the Green River Gorge. The property was a resort for many years before it was donated to the state by Minnie Nolte in the early 1970s. There are rainbow trout, coastal cutthroat trout, kokanee, crappie, and brown bullhead in the lake. The lake has a public fishing pier, beach area, and a hiking trail around the lake. The boat launch is carry-in only with limited parking.

References

External links
Nolte State Park Washington State Parks and Recreation Commission

Parks in King County, Washington
State parks of Washington (state)